Sport is a Spanish daily sports newspaper based in Barcelona, Catalonia, Spain.

History and profile
Founded in 1979, Sport is owned by Grupo Zeta, which also publishes El Periódico de Catalunya.

Ideologically, it defines itself as the newspaper of the supporters of FC Barcelona, its slogan being "Sempre amb el Barça" (always with Barça in Catalan), and caters primarily to a Catalonia-based readership, despite being written in Spanish. It also covers RCD Espanyol and Catalan and Spanish football in general, plus other sports, especially basketball, motor sports, cycling, handball, and tennis.

References

External links
Official homepage

1979 establishments in Spain
Newspapers published in Barcelona
Daily newspapers published in Spain
Newspapers established in 1979
Spanish-language newspapers
Sports newspapers
Sports mass media in Catalonia
Sports mass media in Spain